Walter Gross may refer to:

Walter R. Gross (1903–1974), German palaeontologist
Walter Gross (politician) (1904–1945), German Nazi politician
Walter Gross (actor) (1904–1989), German actor in Two Hearts in May (1958) and other films
Walter Gross (cyclist) (born 1915), Swiss cyclist
Walter Gross (journalist) (1911–1995), Israeli journalist of German birth
Walter Gross (musician) (1909–1967), American songwriter

See also
Gross (surname)